Renato Salvatori (20 March 1933 – 27 March 1988) was an Italian actor.

Born in Seravezza, Province of Lucca, Salvatori began his career in his teens playing juvenile, romantic roles. After working with directors such as Luchino Visconti, Roberto Rossellini and Vittorio De Sica, he developed into one of Italy's strongest characters actors.

He met French actress Annie Girardot on the set of the film Rocco and His Brothers (1960) and married her on 6 January 1962. They had a daughter, Giulia; later the couple separated but never divorced.

Salvatori died in Rome of cirrhosis of the liver on March 27, 1988, seven days after his 55th birthday.

Selected filmography

Three Girls from Rome (1952) - Augusto Terenzi
The Three Pirates (1952) - Il Corsaro Rosso - Rolando di Ventimiglia
Good Folk's Sunday (1953) - Giulio
Jolanda, the Daughter of the Black Corsair (1953) - Ralf, figlio di Morgan
What Scoundrels Men Are! (1953) - Carletto
Public Opinion (1954) - Mario
The Virtuous Bigamist (1956) - Gino - le frère de Maria
Poveri ma belli (1957) - Salvatore
Husbands in the City (1957) - Mario
Pretty But Poor (1957) - Salvatore
Oh! Sabella (1957) - Raffaele Rizzullo
Big Deal on Madonna Street (1958) - Mario Angeletti
Mogli pericolose (1958) - Federico Carpi
Nella città l'inferno (1959) - Piero
Poveri milionari (1959) - Salvatore
Policarpo (1959) - Mario Marchetti
Winter Holidays (1959) - Gianni
The Magliari (1959) - Mario Balducci
Audace colpo dei soliti ignoti (1959) - Mario Angeletti
Vento del sud (1959) - Antonio Spagara
Escape by Night (1960) - Renato Balducci
Rocco and His Brothers (1960) - Simone Parondi
Two Women (1960) - Florindo, il camionista (uncredited)
A Day for Lionhearts (1961) - Orlando
Disorder (1962) - Mario
Le glaive et la balance (1963) - François Corbier
The Shortest Day (1963) - Soldato
Omicron (1963) - Omicron / Angelo
La banda Casaroli (1963) - Paolo Casaroli
The Organizer (1963) - Raoul
Three Nights of Love (1964) - Nicola (segment "La vedova")
The Reckless (1965) - Ettore Zambrini
 How to Seduce a Playboy (1966) - Boy Schock
Her Harem (1967) - Gaetano
Z  (1969) - Yago
Burn! (1969) - Teddy Sanchez
The Light at the Edge of the World (1971) - Montefiore
The Burglars (1971) - Renzi
La prima notte di quiete (1972) - Marcello
State of Siege (1972) - Captain Lopez
Au rendez-vous de la mort joyeuse (1972) - Henri
The Burned Barns (1973) - The Hôtelier
A Brief Vacation (1973) - Franco Mataro, the husband
The Suspect (1975) - Gavino Pintus
Flic Story (1975) - Mario Poncini
The Gypsy (1975) - Jo Amila, dit "Jo le boxeur"
Illustrious Corpses (1976) - Police commissary
Live Like a Cop, Die Like a Man (1976) - Pasquini
The Last Woman (1976) - Rene
Todo modo (1976) - Dr. Scalambri
Armaguedon (1977) - Albert, called 'Einstein'
Ernesto (1979) - Cesc
La luna (1979) - Communist
Oggetti smarriti (1980) - Davide
The Cricket  (1980) - Carburo
Asso (1981) - Bretella
Tragedy of a Ridiculous Man (1981) - Colonel (final film role)

External links

1933 births
1988 deaths
Actors from the Province of Lucca
Deaths from cirrhosis
Italian male film actors
20th-century Italian male actors
Burials in the Protestant Cemetery, Rome